The 1991 PSA Men's World Open Squash Championship is the men's edition of the 1991 World Open, which serves as the individual world championship for squash players. The event took place in Adelaide in Australia from 30 July to 4 August 1991. Rodney Martin won his first World Open title, defeating Jahangir Khan in the final.

Seeds

Draw and results

See also
PSA World Open
1990 Women's World Open Squash Championship

References

External links
World Squash History

M
World Squash Championships
Squash tournaments in Australia
1991 in Australian sport
Sports competitions in Adelaide
International sports competitions hosted by Australia
July 1991 sports events in Australia
August 1991 sports events in Australia
1990s in Adelaide